Andrew Bird & the Mysterious Production of Eggs is the third album of Andrew Bird's career post-Bowl of Fire, released in 2005, following his Weather Systems in 2003. The album art, along with track illustrations in the accompanying booklet were drawn by Jay Ryan. Bird expanded on his earlier work on Weather Systems; the song "Skin Is, My" is an outgrowth of his earlier song "Skin".

Reception

"Fake Palindromes" was listed as the 331st best song of the 2000s by the music website Pitchfork. Pitchfork also placed the album at number 181 on their list of top 200 albums of the 2000s.

The album has sold 80,000 copies in the United States by November 2008.

The album was rereleased in February 2017.

Track listing

Other appearances

 Tracks 3, 5, and 14 are found on Fingerlings 3.

Personnel
Andrew Birdvocals, guitar, violin, glockenspiel, whistles 
David Boucherproduction
Kevin O'Donnelldrums, percussion, beats
Nora O'Connorbacking vocals
David Boucher, Dan Dietrich, Mark Greenberg, Mike Napolitano, Mark Neversengineering
David Bouchermixing
Jim DeMainmastering
Jason Harveylayout design
Jay Ryanartwork, drawing

References

Mysterious Production of Eggs
2005 albums
Righteous Babe Records albums